Droog Fort (also called bakasura malai fort) is a historic fort located  from Coonoor, The Nilgiris, Tamil Nadu.  The fort was used as an outpost by Tipu Sultan in the 18th century.  Today, the fort is in ruins, with only one wall remaining.  The site attracts tourists, who reach the fort by hiking through the Nonsuch Tea Estate.

See also
 Coonoor
 Nilgiri mountains
 Catherine Falls
 Lamb's Rock
 Sim's Park
 Law's Falls
 Dolphin's Nose
 Katary Falls
 Lady Canning's Seat

Tourist attractions in Nilgiris district
Forts in Tamil Nadu
Coonoor